Tony D. Bauernfeind is a United States Air Force lieutenant general who serves as commander of the Air Force Special Operations Command since December 9, 2022. He most recently served as vice commander of the United States Special Operations Command from 2020 to 2022; as vice commander, Bauernfeind was responsible for planning, coordinating, and executing actions with the Office of the Secretary of Defense, the Joint Staff, the services and other government agencies in the national capital region on behalf of the commander of United States Special Operations Command. He previously served as Special Operations Command's chief of staff and as commander of Special Operations Command Korea.

In June 2022, Bauernfeind was selected as commander of the Air Force Special Operations Command.

Awards and decorations

Effective dates of promotions

References

\

|-

Year of birth missing (living people)
Living people
Place of birth missing (living people)
United States Air Force Academy alumni
Auburn University alumni
Air Command and Staff College alumni
United States Air Force generals
Lieutenant generals
Recipients of the Defense Superior Service Medal
Recipients of the Legion of Merit